General Sir Patrick John Howard-Dobson,  (12 August 1921 – 8 November 2009) was a senior British Army officer and Quartermaster-General to the Forces.

Early life
Patrick Howard-Dobson was born on 12 August 1921 in Leicester, Leicestershire, England, and educated at King's College School, Cambridge and Framlingham College.

Military career
During the Second World War, Howard-Dobson was commissioned as a second lieutenant into the Yorkshire Hussars in 1941. He saw action as a tank troop commander in the 7th Queen's Own Hussars, to which he was transferred, during the long withdrawal from Rangoon in Burma during the early stages of the Burma Campaign. The regiment formed part of the 7th Armoured Brigade, and, after serving in India, Iraq, Palestine, Syria, and Egypt, landed in Italy in early May 1944. Howard-Dobson, along with the rest of the brigade, were to remain there for the rest of the war, engaged in the fighting on the Italian Front. He again saw action during the fourth and final Battle of Monte Cassino, and later, while attached to Lieutenant General Władysław Anders's Polish II Corps, at the Battle of Ancona, the fighting on the Gothic Line and, in April 1945, at the Spring 1945 offensive in Italy, which brought an end to the war in Italy. For his distinguished services in the war he was awarded the Italian Virtuti Militari and the US Silver Star.

After being granted a commission in the Regular Army, Howard-Dobson attended the Staff College, Camberley. In 1963 he was made commanding officer of the Queen's Own Hussars and then, in 1965, he was appointed commander of the 20th Armoured Brigade, then serving in Germany as part of the British Army of the Rhine. Following this appointment, he returned to England to attend the Imperial Defence College (now the Royal College of Defence Studies, usually only for officers who were destined to become high-flyers). In 1968 he became the last Chief of Staff at British Far East Command in Singapore. He was Commandant of the Staff College, Camberley from 1972, Military Secretary from 1974 and then Quartermaster-General to the Forces from 1977. In 1979 he was made Vice-Chief of the Defence Staff (Personnel & Logistics). He retired in 1981.

Howard-Dobson lived in Benington, Hertfordshire for over 25 years.

In retirement Howard-Dobson was chairman of the Council of St Luke's Hospital for the Clergy.

Family
In 1946 Howard-Dobson married Barbara Mary Mills and together they had two sons and one daughter.

References

|-

|-
 

|-
 

|-

1921 births
2009 deaths
7th Queen's Own Hussars officers
Alumni of King's College, Cambridge
Graduates of the Royal College of Defence Studies
British Army generals
British Army personnel of World War II
Commandants of the Staff College, Camberley
Foreign recipients of the Silver Star
Graduates of the Staff College, Camberley
Knights Grand Cross of the Order of the Bath
People educated at Framlingham College
People from Benington, Hertfordshire
Military personnel from Leicester
Queen's Own Hussars officers
Recipients of the Silver Cross of the Virtuti Militari
Yorkshire Hussars officers